Climax may refer to:

Language arts 
 Climax (narrative), the point of highest tension in a narrative work
 Climax (rhetoric), a figure of speech that lists items in order of importance

Biology 
 Climax community, a biological community that has reached a steady state because the life there is best adapted to the area
 Climax (sexual), another expression for orgasm
 Climax (beetle), a genus of beetles

Film and television 
 Climax (1965 film), a 1965 Norwegian drama film
 Climax!, a 1950s American television series
 Climax (2013 film), a 2013 Indian biographical film
 Climax (2018 film), a 2018 French-Belgian horror film

Music 
 Climax (band), a 1970s American rock band best known for their soft rock hit "Precious and Few"
 Climax Blues Band, a British blues-based rock band formed in 1968
 Climax (La'Mule album), 2001
 Climax (Ohio Players album), by American band The Ohio Players
 Climax (Plan B album), 2018
 "Climax" (Usher song), a 2012 song by singer Usher
 "Climax", a 2000 song by hip hop group Slum Village
 "Climax", a song by Susumu Hirasawa from the video game Detonator Orgun 3
 Climax, a 2013 album by the Spanish singer Edurne
 Clymax, a record label by Bill Haley when he was with Bill Haley & His Comets
 Klymaxx, an all-female R&B band

People 
 John Climacus, 7th-century Christian monk at the monastery on Mount Sinai
 Climax Lawrence, Indian footballer

Places

Canada 
 Climax, Saskatchewan

Turkey 
 Climax (Paphlagonia), a town of ancient Paphlagonia

United States 
 Climax, Colorado, an unincorporated mining village and a former post office
 Climax, Georgia
 Climax, Kansas
 Climax, Kentucky
 Climax, Michigan
 Climax Township, Michigan
 Climax, Minnesota
 Climax Springs, Missouri
 Climax, New York, a hamlet in Greene County
 Climax, North Carolina
 Climax, Ohio, an unincorporated community
 Climax, Oregon, an unincorporated community
 Climax, Pennsylvania
 Climax, Texas
 Climax, Virginia

Transportation 
 Airborne Climax, a hang glider
 Climax locomotive, a geared steam locomotive

Video games 
 Climax Entertainment, a video game studio based in Japan
 Climax Group, a global game development studio

Other uses 
 Coventry Climax, an engine manufacturer

See also 
 The Climax (disambiguation)